Strogen is a river of Bavaria, Germany. Its source is northwest of Buch am Buchrain in the district Erding. On its way north, the river splits into a main channel and the parallel "Strogenkanal", both of which join the Sempt, a tributary of the Isar, near Moosburg.

See also
List of rivers of Bavaria

References

2Strogen
Rivers of Bavaria
Rivers of Germany